Litorivivens aequoriss is a Gram-negative, strictly aerobic, chemoheterotrophic and motile bacterium from the genus of Litorivivens which has been isolated from seawater from the beach of Najeong in Korea.

References 

Gammaproteobacteria
Bacteria described in 2017